The New Hampshire Junior Monarchs are a junior and youth ice hockey organization from Hooksett, New Hampshire, with teams in the United States Premier Hockey League (USPHL). Its highest level junior team plays in the USPHL's National Collegiate Development Conference (NCDC).

History
The franchise was a charter member of the Eastern Junior Hockey League (EJHL) in 1993. For the first two seasons, they were known as the Granite State Stars located in Dover, New Hampshire, then they moved to Biddeford, Maine and were known as the Great Northern Snow Devils. In 1999 they moved to Exeter, New Hampshire, and were known as the Exeter Snow Devils, before moving to Hooksett in 2001 and becoming the Junior Monarchs.

In 2013, Tier III junior hockey leagues underwent a large reorganization, which included the Monarchs joining the Atlantic Junior Hockey League (AtJHL). The Atlantic Junior Hockey League then re-branded itself as the Eastern Hockey League (EHL). 

In December 2016, it was announced that the Monarchs were leaving the EHL for the United States Premier Hockey League (USPHL) beginning in the 2017–18 season and transferring their teams to the corresponding Premier, Elite, U18, and U16 divisions. The Jr. Monarchs then added a tuition-free team in the National Collegiate Development Conference (NCDC) of the USPHL beginning in 2018.

Team members and regular season
The Junior Monarchs hold tryouts in April. The majority of players must be between the ages of 16 and 20, though select players age 14 and up may be considered. The season starts the day after Labor Day and playoffs finish during the third week of March each year. The schedule includes 44 EHL regular season games plus three rounds of playoffs.

Coach
Sean Tremblay was the general manager and head coach of the New Hampshire Junior Monarchs from 2001 to 2012, and won the EJHL's 'Coach of the Year,' award in 1997, 2002, and 2006, as well as named 'Junior Coach of the Year' by Hockey Night in Boston in 2002, 2004, and 2006. In August 2006, he assisted the USA Under-17 Select Team to a Gold Medal in the Three Nations Tournament. In 2012, he left to become the head coach of the Islanders Hockey Club.

Tremblay was then replaced by Ryan Frew, head coach of the Monarchs' Junior B team in the Empire Junior Hockey League. Frew eventually led the team into the Eastern Hockey League and won a league championship in 2016. He won the NCDC Coach of the Year in 2019. Frew died from peritonitis on October 5, 2020.

Season-by-season records 1993-2017

Season-by-season records 2017-Present

USA Hockey Tier III Junior A National Championships
Round robin play in pool with top 4 teams advancing to semi-final.

* - unverified scores
** - Monarchs win one game playoff with the Boston Junior Rangers (MetJHL) and named "HOST"

Notable alumni
The Jr. Monarchs have produced a number of alumni playing in higher levels of junior hockey, NCAA Division I, Division III, and ACHA college programs including several National Hockey League draft picks.
Greg Burke, 2006–2008: Washington Capitals, 2008, 6th round, 174th overall
John Doherty, 2002–03: Toronto Maple Leafs, 2003, 2nd round, 57th overall
Matt Duffy, 2003–2005: Florida Panthers, 2005, 4th round, 104th overall
Brian Dumoulin, 2008–09: Carolina Hurricanes, 2009, 2nd round, 51st overall
Brian Foster, 2003–2005: Florida Panthers, 2005, 5th round, 161st overall
John Laliberte, 2001–02: Vancouver Canucks, 2002, 4th round, 114th overall
Joe Pearce, 2001–02: Tampa Bay Lightning, 2002, 5th round, 135th overall
Jonathan Rheault, 2003–04: Philadelphia Flyers, 2006, 5th round, 145th overall
Andrew Thomas, 2001–2003: Washington Capitals, 2005, 4th round, 109th overall

Notes and references

External links
 Jr. Monarchs Home Page

Ice hockey teams in New Hampshire
Merrimack County, New Hampshire
Ice hockey clubs established in 1993
1993 establishments in New Hampshire